The Puruba River is a river of São Paulo state in southeastern Brazil.

See also
List of rivers of São Paulo

References

Rivers of São Paulo (state)